In the Sun may refer to:

 In the Sun (Alexander Samokhvalov), a 1953 painting by Alexander Samokhvalov
 In the Sun (Demetrio Cosola), a 1884 painting by Demetrio Cosola
 "In the Sun" (Joseph Arthur song), covered by Michael Stipe
 "In the Sun" (She & Him song)
 "In the Sun", a song by Blondie from Blondie
 "In the Sun", a song by Seam from The Pace Is Glacial
 In the Sun, an album by Thomas Rusiak

See also
 In the Sunlight, a 1915 American silent short film